The 2017–18 Harvard Crimson women's basketball team represents Harvard University during the 2017–18 NCAA Division I women's basketball season. The Crimson, led by thirty-sixth year head coach Kathy Delaney-Smith, play their home games at the Lavietes Pavilion and were members of the Ivy League. They finished the season 18–11, 10–4 in Ivy League play to finish in third place. They lost in the semifinals of the Ivy women's tournament to Penn. They received an at-large bid to the WNIT where they lost to Fordham in the first round.

Previous season
They finished the season 21–6, 8–6 in Ivy League play to finish in third place. They lost in the semifinals of the Ivy women's tournament to Princeton. They were invited to the WNIT where defeated New Hampshire in the first round before losing to St. John's in the second round.

Roster

Schedule

|-
!colspan=8 style=| Regular season

|-
!colspan=8 style=| Ivy League Tournament

|-
!colspan=8 style=| WNIT

Rankings
2017–18 NCAA Division I women's basketball rankings

See also
 2017–18 Harvard Crimson men's basketball team

References

Harvard
Harvard Crimson women's basketball seasons
Harvard Crimson women's basketball
Harvard Crimson women's basketball
Harvard
Harvard Crimson women's basketball
Harvard Crimson women's basketball